American football is the most popular sport in the United States. The National Football League has the highest revenue and average attendance of any sports league in the world. In the United States, the game is most often referred to as simply "football".

Organization in the United States

There is no single national governing body for American football in the United States or a continental governing body for North America. There is an international governing body, the International Federation of American Football, or IFAF.
Befitting its status as a popular sport, football is played in leagues of different size, age and quality, in all regions of the country.  A team / academy may be referred to as a 'football program' – not to be confused with football program.

Professional 
The governing body for American football in the United States is USA Football.

The 32-team National Football League (NFL) is currently the only major American football league in the United States. There have been numerous attempts over the past several decades to create a second major or high-level professional league, most of which failed within a few years or, in the cases of the All-America Football Conference and 1960s American Football League, merged with the NFL.

The NFL has not operated any developmental minor leagues since the folding of the NFL Europe League in 2007. From the time of the Spring Football League's 2000 collapse until the founding of the independent United Football League in 2009, there were no minor American football leagues (independent or affiliated) anywhere in the country. Since then, there has been the Stars Football League (which ran from 2011 through 2013), Fall Experimental Football League (which played from 2014 to 2015 before it was reformatted as the non-paying The Spring League from 2017 to 2022, then into the paying new United States Football League in 2022), and the Alliance of American Football, which played one abbreviated season in 2019 before collapsing in a management dispute. The AAF positioned itself as an upper-level minor league serving to transition between the college game and the NFL.

The XFL, a revamp of a league of the same name that played one season in 2001, began play in February 2020. In contrast to the former AAF, it does not position itself as a minor league, but an independent alternative league. But the COVID-19 pandemic five weeks into the season caused the league to go on hiatus, with the league set to return in 2023 under new ownership.

There are several professional and semi-professional indoor football leagues, played at Hockey-sized arenas. The largest and oldest one is the Indoor Football League which has 13 teams spanning from Ohio to California. Historically the Arena Football League, which launched in 1987 was the most prominent league but as the league had operational issues following its 2008 bankruptcy, teams folded and left for other leagues before the Arena Football League folded in 2019. The National Arena League includes the intellectual properties of several former AFL teams; other leagues such as the American Arena League and Champions Indoor Football are primarily semi-professional. Most indoor leagues are regional in nature. Indoor football leagues play by significantly different rules that accommodate a smaller field of play.

Some players that do not make the NFL play in the XFL, in indoor leagues, or go to Canada and play in the Canadian Football League, which operates professionally on a somewhat older rule system with a number of differences from the American game but still recognizable as "football" to the casual American football observer. The CFL allocates half of its teams' rosters for players born and raised in Canada but allows he rest of the players to be foreign born (in practice, these spots are almost always filled by Americans); the CFL also has television presence in the United States and as recently as 1995 played games in the U.S.

University and collegiate 

College football is also popular throughout North America. Most of college football in the United States is governed by the NCAA. Many colleges and universities have football teams, often with dedicated football stadiums. These teams mostly play other similarly sized schools, through the NCAA's divisional system, which divides collegiate sports teams into four divisions (I-FBS, I-FCS, II and III).  The largest, most popular collegiate teams routinely fill stadiums larger than 75,000.  Eight college football stadiums—the University of Michigan's Michigan Stadium, Penn State's Beaver Stadium, Ohio State's Ohio Stadium, Texas A&M's Kyle Field, the University of Tennessee's Neyland Stadium, LSU's Tiger Stadium, Alabama's Bryant–Denny Stadium, and Darrell K Royal–Texas Memorial Stadium at the University of Texas at Austin—seat more than 100,000 fans and usually sell out.  The weekly autumn ritual of college football includes marching bands, cheerleaders, homecoming, parties, the tailgate party; it forms an important part of the culture in much of small-town America. Football is a major source of revenue to the athletic programs of schools, public and private, in the United States. The top college football players enter the NFL Draft after their college careers are over, in hopes of signing with an NFL team.

"FBS" and "FCS" are abbreviations for the Football Bowl Subdivision and Football Championship Subdivision, two sections of Division I that exist only in football. These two subdivisions were formerly known as Divisions I-A and I-AA respectively. The Championship Subdivision, consisting mostly of smaller schools than the FBS but larger than D-II, has a multiple-round playoff system just like Divisions II and III, while the Bowl Subdivision has only a limited, and unofficial, four-team playoff and has historically only featured division championships and bowl games. FBS and FCS teams can, and often do, play against each other. Unofficially, the Bowl Subdivision is divided into two further subdivisions, "major conferences" (also known as "Power Five conferences") and "mid-majors" (known in modern parlance as the "Group of Five"). In practice, only major conference teams are eligible to compete for the national championship and receive significant favor in the opinion polling over mid-majors, and it was not until the addition of the BCS National Championship Game that mid-majors had a realistic chance at appearing in one of the major bowls. Although the FCS has a playoff, three conferences do not participate (the Ivy League does not allow its teams to play in the postseason, and the historically black SWAC and MEAC instead play each other in a bowl of their own). Division III teams do not offer scholarships to their players; two Division I FCS leagues also do not offer scholarships—the Ivy League, which prohibits athletic scholarships in any sport, and the Pioneer Football League, which only competes in football and whose members all offer scholarships in non-football sports.

With the exception of the annual Army–Navy Game, only Power Five conference teams air on national broadcast television, although mid-majors, FCS teams, D-II and D-III games can see more limited coverage on cable and local television.

Though the NCAA is the most publicized college athletic organization, the NAIA (which houses mostly smaller private colleges in the midwest), NJCAA (an association for community colleges), and California Community College Athletic Association (CCCAA) (that state's equivalent to the NJCAA) also sanction football games; there also exists a club football circuit for student-run teams and colleges that choose not to compete at the varsity level.

High school 

Most American high schools field football teams.  High school football is popular; top schools regularly fill stadiums holding over 10,000 fans, and can afford artificial playing surfaces.

High school teams generally play only against other teams from their state (notable exceptions include matchups between nearby schools located on opposite sides of a state line and occasional matchups between two nationally ranked teams for television purposes). Still, some private Christian high schools play for national championships through organizations like the Federated Christian Athletic Association. Public high school football in most states, as is the case with other high school sports, is governed by the National Federation of State High School Associations (NFHS).

For rural schools that do not have the student body to support a full football team, the NFHS sanctions nine-man football (most popular in the upper Midwest), six-man football (most commonly used in Texas, although previously more widely popular and undergoing a minor revival elsewhere), and eight-man football (which the most common reduced-man format in most other states).

Adult Amateur Football and Semi-Pro Football 
Adult amateur football, also known as semi-pro football, is a level of American football.  It is commonly known as "working man's" football, meaning the players have regular jobs and play football on the weekends. Though the players do not get paid, the leagues and the games are run in a somewhat professional manner. For most leagues, it is against the rules to pay its players to play.  The rules of the game are usually a hybrid of NFL and NCAA rules.

There are several different leagues playing in the United States:

The North American Football League (NAFL) was an adult amateur American football league.  Its teams were located mainly in the Eastern, Midwestern and Southern United States.  The teams mostly played regionally in the regular season to keep travel short.  In the playoffs, winners of regional play will meet each other for the league championship.

The New England Football League (NEFL) has over 30 teams, with at least one in each of the six New England states.  The league has three skill levels (A being more for recreational play; AAA being the most competitive; AA is somewhat in between).

The Eastern Football League, based in New England, but at times teams from New York state have competed, is one of the country's oldest semi-pro leagues.  It started play in 1961.

The Mid Continental Football League began play in 1991 and by the 1990s had expanded through much of the midwest and mid-Atlantic United States before the league split apart and contracted into a four-state area in the midwest. Upstate New York also houses the oldest surviving professional football club in the United States, the Watertown Red & Black, founded in 1896.

The Pacific Northwest Football League (PNFL) started in 2016 and currently has six teams, including four in Portland, Oregon and 2 in Vancouver, Washington.

Several leagues supporting women's semi-professional football play have existed. The current major league is the Women's Football Alliance (WFA). The WFA started to play in 2009 stocked with teams from two dissolved leagues, the National Women's Football Association and Women's Professional Football League (NWFA and WPFL respectively).

US National American football team 

USA Football assembles a national football team for competition in the IFAF World Championship every four years. Because of concerns over competitive balance, USA Football did not field teams for the first two events in 1999 and 2003. The 2007 team consisted solely of amateur players who had graduated from college that spring, from a diverse mix of smaller and larger colleges and universities. The 2011 squad's criteria were looser, allowing some professional players to play (mostly unemployed, lower-end and minor league players; no NFL or NCAA stars participated). Both the 2007 and 2011 incarnations of the team won their year's respective world championship.

The IFAF also fields an U-19 team composed of high school football players that has participated in the 2009, 2012, 2014 and 2016 junior world championships. The national U-19 team won the 2009 and 2014 contests but lost the 2012 contest to Canada.

Women's Football in the United States

Women's Football teams in the United States have had many Sports leagues, among them can be named the Women's Professional Football League (1965-1973), the Women's Professional Football League, the Independent Women's Football League, the Women's Football Alliance and the X League. In 1970 Patricia Palinkas became the holder of the Orlando Panthers and became the first woman to play in the Atlantic Coast Football League, and in 2010 Katie Hnida became the kicker for the Fort Wayne FireHawks in the Continental Indoor Football League.

See also
National Football League
 Women's Football in the United States

References

External links

NCAA's complete college football rules; available as a PDF file 
National Football League Official Signals.
Annual Survey of Football Injury Research
American Youth Football
American Football rules and History
American football training drills

 
American Football League
Chestnut Hill College